Hurricane Mitch was the second-deadliest Atlantic hurricane on record, only after the Great Hurricane of 1780 which had ~22,000 casualties. Hurricane Mitch caused 11,374 fatalities in Central America in 1998, including approximately 7,000 in Honduras and 3,800 in Nicaragua due to cataclysmic flooding from the slow motion of the storm. It was the deadliest hurricane in Central American history, surpassing Hurricane Fifi–Orlene, which killed slightly fewer people there in 1974.

The thirteenth named storm, ninth hurricane, and third major hurricane of the 1998 Atlantic hurricane season, Mitch formed in the western Caribbean Sea on October 22, and after drifting through extremely favorable conditions, it rapidly strengthened to peak at Category 5 status, the highest possible rating on the Saffir–Simpson Hurricane Scale. After drifting southwestward and weakening, the hurricane hit Honduras as a minimal hurricane. Mitch drifted through Central America, regenerated in the Bay of Campeche, and ultimately struck Florida as a strong tropical storm. It then became extratropical and accelerated northeastward across the North Atlantic, before dissipating on November 9. At the time, Mitch was the strongest Atlantic hurricane observed in the month of October, though it has since been surpassed by Hurricane Wilma of the 2005 season. In addition, Mitch is the eighth-most intense Atlantic hurricane on record, tied with Hurricane Dean in 2007 in terms of pressure.

Being "the deadliest Atlantic hurricane" in over 200 years, Mitch caused catastrophic impacts across its path, but the most disastrous impacts came from Honduras, which suffered over half of the total deaths. The President of Honduras estimated that Mitch set back 50 years of economic development. The storm wrecked about 35,000 houses and damaged another 50,000, leaving up to 1.5 million people homeless, or about 20 percent of the country's population. Mitch directly caused $2.005 billion in damage, with an additional $1.8 billion in indirect costs. Most of the damage was ruined crops, and cash crop exports were cut by 9.4 percent in 1999, largely due to the storm. Over 70 percent of the transportation infrastructure was damaged, mostly damaged highways and bridges. Widespread areas experienced power outages, and about 70 percent of the country lost water after the storm. In the capital, Tegucigalpa, a large landslide affected three neighborhoods and formed a temporary dam. Floods in the city damaged buildings that were over 350 years old. Throughout the country, there were at least 7,000 fatalities, some reported in each department. Following the storm, officials in Honduras requested international assistance, which totaled $2.8 billion over a several-year period. Despite this, the gross domestic product began decreasing at the end of 1998, and contracted by 1.9 percent in 1999. Officials enacted a widespread curfew following the storm, and for 15 days temporarily restricted constitutional rights to maintain order. There were outbreaks of various diseases, and many residents faced food and water shortages.

Deaths due to catastrophic flooding made it the second deadliest Atlantic hurricane in history after the Great Hurricane of 1780; at least 11,374 people were confirmed to have been killed with over 11,000 left missing by the end of 1998; the true death toll may never be known. Additionally, roughly 2.7 million were left homeless as a result of the hurricane. Total damages caused by the hurricane were estimated to be around $6 billion (1998 USD). The name "Mitch" was retired, and will not be used for another Atlantic tropical cyclone.

Meteorological history

Tropical Depression Thirteen formed on October 22 over the southwestern Caribbean Sea, from a tropical wave that exited Africa on October 10. It executed a small loop, and while doing so intensified into Tropical Storm Mitch. A weakness in a ridge allowed the storm to track slowly to the north. After becoming disorganized due to wind shear from an upper-level low, Mitch quickly intensified in response to favorable conditions, including warm waters and good outflow. It became a hurricane on October 24 and developed an eye. After turning to the west, Mitch rapidly intensified, first into a major hurricane on October 25 and then into a Category 5 on the Saffir-Simpson Hurricane Scale the next day.

At peak intensity, Mitch maintained maximum sustained winds of 180 mph (285 km/h) while off the northern coast of Honduras. Initially, the National Hurricane Center (NHC) and various tropical cyclone forecast models anticipated a turn to the north, threatening the Yucatán peninsula. Instead, Mitch turned to the south, due to a ridge that was not observed while the storm was active.

While over land, Mitch moved slowly westward through Central America, while continuing to produce deep convection over waters. The surface circulation dissipated on November 1. The next day, the remnants of Mitch reached the Bay of Campeche. On November 3, the remnants redeveloped into a tropical storm just off the coast of the Mexican state of Campeche, and a day later the storm made another landfall just north of the city of Campeche. Mitch accelerated to the northeast ahead of a cold front, moving across the Yucatán peninsula and re-entering the Gulf of Mexico. The storm reattained winds of 70 mph (110 km/h) before it made a final landfall near Naples, Florida on November 5. Shortly after crossing the state, Mitch transitioned into an extratropical cyclone. The NHC tracked this storm until November 9, when former Hurricane Mitch passed north of Scotland.

Preparations
Due to the threat, the government of Honduras evacuated some of the 45,000 citizens on the Bay Islands and prepared all air and naval resources. The government of Belize issued a purple alert and asked for citizens on offshore islands to leave for the mainland. Because the hurricane threatened to strike near Belize City as a Category 4 hurricane, much of the city was evacuated in fear of a repeat of Hurricane Hattie 37 years earlier. Guatemala issued a purple alert as well, recommending boats to stay in port, telling people to prepare or seek shelter, and warning of potential overflowing rivers. By the time hurricane Mitch made landfall, numerous people were evacuated along the western Caribbean coastline, including 100,000 in Honduras, 10,000 in Guatemala, and 20,000 in the Mexican state of Quintana Roo.

Impact

Hurricane Mitch was the deadliest Atlantic hurricane since the Great Hurricane of 1780, displacing the Galveston Hurricane of 1900 as the second-deadliest on record. Nearly 11,000 people were confirmed dead, and almost as many reported missing. The flooding and mudslides damaged or destroyed tens of thousands of homes, with total damage amounting to over $5 billion (1998 USD, $6 billion 2006 USD), most of which was in Honduras and Nicaragua. Prior to Mitch, the deadliest hurricane in Central America was Hurricane Fifi in 1974, which killed an estimated 8,000–10,000.

Honduras

While offshore northern Honduras, Hurricane Mitch passed over Guanaja island. High waves eroded northern coastlines and damaged lagoons. Most of the Bay Islands had damage to their water facilities. Two days of winds exceeding  destroyed nearly all of the plants and trees on Guanaja, uprooting or knocking down almost the entire mangrove forest. It is estimated that the hurricane produced waves of 44 ft (13 m) in height.

The high rainfall caused many rivers in the country to overflow "to an unprecedented extent this century", as described by the United Nations. The rainfall collected in rivers, causing extensive river flooding across the country. The rainfall also caused widespread mudslides across the mountainous country. In the country's interior, particularly the southern portion, the high rainfall caused hundreds of landslides, many of them shallow and about 95% in the form of debris flow. However, two earthflows caused significant damage near Tegucigalpa.

Hurricane Mitch wrought significant damage to Honduras, affecting nearly the entire population and causing damage in all 18 departments. The United Nations Economic Commission for Latin America and the Caribbean estimated that Mitch caused the worst floods of the 20th century in the country. An estimated 70–80% of transportation network was destroyed, including most bridges and secondary roads, amounting to $236 million in damage. About 70% of Honduras lost access to fresh water after the storm, although many rural areas had already been experiencing water shortages. The combined damage to transportation, communication, utilities, including power and water, was estimated at $665 million.

The floods damaged about one-third of buildings, including some more than 350 years old. Across Honduras, agriculture sustained serious damage, with initial estimates of 70% of crops destroyed. About 50,000 bovine were killed, as were 60% of the fowl population. Crop and agricultural damage totaled about $1 billion, which would take the country years to recover. Honduras's Social Fund for Housing estimated that 35,000 houses nationwide were destroyed with another 50,000 damaged, leaving 1.5 million people homeless – about 20% of the total population. This was the highest number of victims from any natural disaster in Honduras's history. Overall, Hurricane Mitch killed about 7,000 people in Honduras, and damage was estimated at L52,345,000,000 ($3.8 billion), of which $2.005 billion was from direct damages and the remainder from indirect costs. The overall impact represented about 70% of Honduras's annual gross domestic product (GDP).

Nicaragua

The flank of the Casita Volcano failed and turned into a lahar from excessive rain. The resulting mudslide ultimately covered an area 10 miles (16 km) long and 5 miles (8 km) wide.

Two million people in Nicaragua were directly affected by the hurricane. Across the country, Mitch's heavy rains damaged 17,600 houses and destroyed 23,900, displacing 368,300 of the population. 340 schools and 90 health centers were severely damaged or destroyed. Sewage systems and the electricity subsector were severely damaged, and, combined with property, damage totaled to $300 million (1998 USD).

Transportation was greatly affected by the hurricane, as well. The rainfall left 70% of the roads unusable or destroyed and greatly damaged 92 bridges. Over 1,700 miles (2700 km) of highways or access roads needed replacement subsequent to the storm, especially in the northern part of the country and along portions of the Pan-American Highway. Total transportation damage amounted to $300 million (1998 USD). Agricultural losses were significant, including the deaths of 50,000 animals, mostly bovines. Crops and fisheries were affected greatly as well, and, combined with agricultural losses, damage totaled to $185 million (1998 USD).

The situation was further compounded by a total of 75,000 live land mines—left over from the Contra insurgency of the 1980s—that were calculated to have been uprooted and relocated by the floodwaters.

In all, Hurricane Mitch caused at least 3,800 fatalities in Nicaragua, of which more than 2,000 were killed in the towns of El Provenir and Rolando Rodriguez from the landslide at the Casita volcano. The mudslide buried at least four villages completely in several feet of mud. Throughout the entire country, the hurricane left between 500,000 and 800,000 homeless. In all, damage in Nicaragua is estimated at around $1 billion (1998 USD).

Caribbean Sea
Mitch was also responsible for the loss with all hands of Windjammer Barefoot Cruises' schooner Fantome. The story was recorded in the book The Ship and The Storm by Jim Carrier. The schooner, which was sailing near the center of the hurricane, experienced over 50 foot (15 m) waves and over 100 mph (160 km/h) winds, causing her to sink off the coast of Honduras.

On the south coast of Cuba, the hurricane caused waves of up to 13 feet (4 m) high and winds gusts peaking at 42 mph (67 km/h), causing numerous tourists and workers on the Isle of Youth and Cayo Largo del Sur to leave for safer grounds.

In Jamaica, where officials declared hurricane warnings 12 hours prior to its closest approach, Mitch caused moderate rainfall and gusty winds for days. Strong waves hit western Jamaica, with wave heights unofficially estimated at nearly 7 feet (2 m) in height. The rainfall in outer rainbands, at times severe, flooded many roads across the island and left them covered with debris. One house in Spanish Town collapsed from the flooding, leaving four homeless. Many other homes and buildings were flooded, forcing many to evacuate. A river in northeastern Jamaica overflowed its banks, while heavy rainfall across the mountainous parts of the country caused numerous mudslides. In all, Mitch killed three people on Jamaica.

On the Cayman Islands, the hurricane caused strong waves, gusty winds, and heavy rainfall at times. Damage was relatively minimal, amounting to blown out windows and beach erosion. Strong waves damaged or destroyed many docks on the south shore of the islands, and also sank one dive ship near Grand Cayman. In addition, numerous incoming and outgoing flights were cancelled.

Rest of Central America

Due to Mitch's large circulation, it dropped heavy precipitation as far south as Panama and Colombia, especially in the Darién and Chiriquí provinces. The flooding washed away a few roads and bridges, and damaged numerous houses and schools, leaving thousands homeless. The hurricane left three casualties in Panama.

In Costa Rica, Mitch dropped heavy rains, causing flash flooding and mudslides across the country, mostly in the northeastern part of the country. The storm impacted 2,135 homes to some degree, of which 241 were destroyed, leaving 4,000 homeless. Mitch affected 115 sq. miles (300 km2) of crop lands, causing damage to both export and domestic crops. In all, Hurricane Mitch caused $92 million in damage (1998 USD) and seven deaths.

While drifting through El Salvador, the hurricane dropped immense amounts of precipitation, resulting in flash flooding and mudslides through the country. Multiple rivers, including the Río Grande de San Miguel and the Lempa River overflowed, contributing to overall damage. The flooding damaged more than 10,000 houses, leaving around 84,000 homeless and forcing 500,000 to evacuate. Crop damage was severe, with serious flooding occurring on 386 sq. miles (1000 km2) of pasture or crop land. The flooding destroyed 37% of the bean production, 19% of the corn production, and 20% losses in sugar canes. There were heavy losses in livestock as well, including the deaths of 10,000 cattle. Total agricultural and livestock damaged amounted to $154 million (1998 USD). In addition, the flooding destroyed two bridges and damaged  of unpaved roads. In all, Mitch caused nearly $400 million in damage (1998 USD) and 240 deaths.

Similar to the rest of Central America, Mitch's heavy rains caused mudslides and severe flooding over Guatemala. The flooding destroyed 6,000 houses and damaged 20,000 others, displacing over 730,000 and forcing over 100,000 to evacuate. In addition, the flooding destroyed 27 schools and damaged 286 others, 175 severely. Flooding caused major damage to crops, while landslides destroyed crop land across the country. The most severely affected crops for domestic consumption were tomatoes, bananas, corn, other vegetables, and beans, with damaged totaling to $48 million (1998 USD). Export crops such as bananas or coffee were greatly damaged as well, with damage amounting to $325 million (1998 USD). Damage to plantations and soil totaled to $121 million (1998 USD). The flooding also caused severe damage to the transportation infrastructure, including the loss of 37 bridges. Across the country, flooding damaged or destroyed 840 miles (1350 km) of roads, of which nearly 400 miles (640 km) were sections of major highways. In all, Hurricane Mitch caused $748 million (1998 USD) and 268 deaths in Guatemala. In addition, Mitch caused 11 indirect deaths when a plane crashed during the storm.

In Belize, the hurricane was less severe than initially predicted, though Mitch still caused heavy rainfall across the country. Numerous rivers exceeded their crests, though the rainfall was beneficial to trees in mountainous areas. The flooding caused extensive crop damage and destroyed many roads. Throughout the country, eleven people died because of the hurricane.

In Mexico, Mitch produced gusty winds and heavy rains on the Yucatán Peninsula, with Cancún on the Quintana Roo coast being the worst hit. Nine people were killed from the flooding, though damage was relatively minimal.

Florida and Europe

Key West International Airport reported peak wind gusts of 55 mph (89 km/h) and sustained winds of 40 mph (64 km/h), the only report of tropical storm force in the state. The storm spawned five tornadoes over the state, the strongest of which was rated F2.

In the Florida Keys, multiple buildings that had been damaged by Hurricane Georges were leveled by Mitch. Tornadoes from the storm damaged or destroyed 645 houses across the state, in addition to injuring 65 people. Gusty winds left 100,000 without power during the storm's passage. In all, Mitch caused $40 million in damage (1998 USD) in Florida and two deaths from drowning when two boats capsized.

As an extratropical cyclone, Mitch passed west of Ireland and the United Kingdom. The winds knocked down trees and power lines, leaving over 30,000 homes without power. One tree fell onto a car in Louth, severely injuring the driver. In Dublin, high winds knocked the roof off of a building, and several other buildings nationwide were damaged. The storm caused airports to close and ferry service to be suspended.

Aftermath

As a result of the extreme damage and loss of life it caused, the name Mitch was retired from the Atlantic naming list by the World Meteorological Organization and will not be used for a future Atlantic hurricane. The name was replaced with the name Matthew for the 2004 season.

After the disaster caused by Hurricane Mitch, countries around the world donated significant aid, totaling $6.3 billion (1998 USD). Throughout Central America, which was recovering from an economic crisis that occurred in 1996, many wished to continue the growth of the infrastructure and economy. In addition, after witnessing the vulnerability to hurricanes, the affected governments endeavored to prevent such a disaster from occurring again.

Hundreds of thousands of people lost their homes, but many took this as an opportunity to rebuild stronger houses. With a new, structurally improved foundation, homes were redesigned to be able to withstand another hurricane. However, lack of arable crop land took away the jobs from many, decreasing an already low income even lower.

Following the passage of Mitch, disease outbreaks occurred throughout Central America, including cholera, leptospirosis, and dengue fever. Over 2,328 cases of cholera were reported, killing 34 people. Guatemala was most affected by the bacterium, where most of the deaths occurred from contaminated food. 450 cases of leptospirosis were reported in Nicaragua, killing seven people. There were over 1,357 cases of dengue reported, though no deaths were reported from the disease.

While stalling over the western Caribbean Sea, Mitch's strong winds produced strong waves, damaging local coral reefs. Later, the storm's immense rainfall led to runoff polluted with debris and fresh water. This resulted in diseases occurring within the coral. However, the hurricane's upwelling cooled the warm water temperatures, preventing significant bleaching and destruction of the coral reef.

Mitch caused such massive and widespread damage that Honduran President Carlos Roberto Flores claimed it destroyed fifty years of progress in the country. Honduras, the country most affected by the hurricane, received significant aid for the millions impacted by the hurricane. Mexico quickly gave help, sending 700 tons of food, 11 tons of medicine, four rescue planes, rescue personnel, and trained search dogs. Cuba also volunteered, sending a contingent of physicians to the country. The U.S. administration offered at first troops stationed in Honduras, and then withdrew them a few days after the storm. They also at first offered only $2 million (1998 USD) in aid, which came as a shock to residents, and president Carlos Roberto Flores alike. The U.S. later increased their offer to $70 million (1998 USD). The Honduran government distributed food, water, and medical services to the hurricane victims, including the more than 4 million without water. In addition, the country initially experienced a sharp increase in the unemployment rate, largely due to the destruction of crop lands. However, rebuilding provided jobs in the following years. In Costa Rica, reconstruction after the hurricane increased the number of jobs by 5.9%, lowering the unemployment rate slightly.

See also

Hurricane Mitch impacts
Fantome – A sail cruise ship that was lost during Hurricane Mitch
Hurricane Mitch Victims National Monument

Deadly hurricanes
List of deadliest Atlantic hurricanes
Great Hurricane of 1780 – The deadliest Atlantic hurricane on record
1900 Galveston hurricane – The deadliest hurricane ever to strike the U.S.
Hurricane Flora (1963) - Category 4 hurricane which was the fifth-deadliest Atlantic Hurricane on record.
Hurricane Fifi-Orlene (1974) - Category 2 hurricane which was the third-deadliest Atlantic hurricane on record.
Typhoon Nina (1975) - Category 4 super typhoon which was the deadliest typhoon on record, and the third-deadliest tropical cyclone worldwide.
1970 Bhola cyclone – The deadliest tropical cyclone on record, worldwide

Storms similar in track and/or intensity
List of Category 5 Atlantic hurricanes
List of wettest tropical cyclones
Hurricane Felix (2007) – A Category 5 hurricane that devastated Central America
Hurricane Eta (2020) – A Category 4 hurricane that also devastated Central America and took a similar erratic track through the Caribbean Sea
Hurricane Iota (2020) - A Category 4 hurricane that also brought devastating damage to Central America

References

Notes

Cited sources

External links

NHC tropical cyclone report for Mitch
NHC advisory archive for Mitch
HPC Mitch Rainfall Page

Mitch
Mitch
Mitch
Mitch
Mitch
Mitch
Mitch
Mitch
Mitch
Mitch
1998 natural disasters
1998 in Mexico
1998 in Florida
1998 in El Salvador
1998 in Guatemala
October 1998 events in North America
November 1998 events in North America
Hurricanes in Costa Rica
Hurricanes in Panama